Chinyere Stella Okunna  is the first female professor in Mass communication in Nigeria. She has served in various capacities as an administrator and educationist in the academia and in the public/political arena. Chinyere Stella Okunna research interest is in the area of communication for development, particularly women’s development from the perspective of women and the media. She has done considerable work on the role of the media in the effort to empower Nigerian women and improve their condition and status in the patriarchal male-dominated Nigerian society.

Early life and education 
Born to Joshua and Christiana Adimora family, Uga in Aguata Local Government Area of Anambra State, Nigeria, her father (Joshua Obinani Adimora) was a career civil servant who served as the first indigenous/black District Officer (D.O.) in the Aguata Administrative Region in the 1950s and the Deputy Town Clerk of Port-Harcourt Municipal Council in the 1960s. Stella Chinyere Okunna began her early education at St John's Primary School in Ekwulobia where her father served as a government official and ended at Township School Port-Harcourt from where she proceeded to secondary school from Primary 5. Her Secondary School education was at Anglican Girls Grammar School (which later became Girls High School) Awkunanaw, Enugu, from where she obtained her WASC with Grade 1 Distinction as the Best Student in the exam in her school .

Career

Academia 
Chinyere Stella Okunna started her career as a lecturer in Institute of Management and Technology, Enugu (1981–1994) before she joined the Department of Mass Communication, Nnamdi Azikiwe University in 1994. She became the first female professor of Mass communication in Nigeria in 2001 and remained the only Nigerian female mass communicator to attain such heights for twelve (12) years before the second lecturer, from the same department also became a professor. She was the first female Dean, Faculty of Social Sciences in Nnamdi Azikiwe University (2016–2019). Before then she had been the Faculty Sub-Dean 1996-1998 and Head, Department of Mass Communication 1998–2006. She was able during this period to commence postgraduate programme (PGD, MSc and PhD) and a professional Diploma in Journalism in that department. Chinyere Stella Okunna has received international recognition as her scholarly works appear in Media Culture and Society, Media Development, Journal of Commonwealth Association for Education in Journalism and Communication, Journal of Development Communication, and Africa Media Review.

Also, Stella Chinyere Okunna has served as;

 Member National Universities Commission (NUC)  Accreditation panels for Mass Communication
 External Assessor for Professorship hopefuls
 External Examiner

Her focus in academics is Development Communication/Behaviour Change Gender and Communication.

Public service 
In 2006–2014, Chinyere Stella Okunna took a leave of absence from Nnamdi Azikiwe University and joined public service first as Commissioner, Ministry of Information and Culture (2006–2009). She was then appointed to serve as the Commissioner for Economic Planning and Budget as well as the Coordinating Commissioner for Development Partnership/Donor Agencies (2009–2014). While still working as a Commissioner, she was also saddled with being the Chief of Staff (2012–2014)

She was also the Chair,

Millennium Development Goals (MDGs) Implementation Committee (2009–2014)
 Anambra State Committee on Good Governance (2007–2014)
 Anambra State Vision 2020 (2009–2014)

Stella Chinyere Okunna has also served as a resource person and consultant to many organizations including;

 UNICEF
 UNFPA
 UNESCO
 DFID
 FHI 360 
 SFH (Society for Family Health)
 NUJ
 NAWOJ
 Erich Brost Institute for International Journalism at the Technical University of Dortmund in Germany
 NGE (Nigerian Guild of Editors)
 CIRDDOC (Civil Resource Development and Documentation Centre),

Community service 
Her education and later the foray into public service exposed her to needs in communities and how individuals, NGOs and private organizations can assist and encourage young people to achieve academically. Through an NGO she had established (Adimora-Okunna Scholarship Foundation, 2003), she has been able to source for funds and provide;

 School fees for those who take first positions in two secondary schools in Ukpo
 School fees for indigent students of Ukpo in Nnamdi Azikiwe University, Awka
 A one-storey building (classrooms and an examination hall) in Walter Eze Memorial Secondary School, Ukpo. This was built in 2013 to commemorate the 10yrs anniversary of the Adimora-Okunna Foundation
 The annual Professor Chinyere Stella Okunna Prize for the Best Graduating Student of Mass Communication in Nnamdi Azikiwe University - Fifty Thousand Naira (N50,000),
 The annual Professor Chinyere Stella Okunna Prize for the Best Graduating Student of the Faculty of Social Sciences – Fifty Thousand Naira (N50,000)
 Annual Best Ethical Journalist Award for Nigerian Union of Journalists (NUJ) in Anambra State - Fifty Thousand Naira (N50,000)
 The Professor Chinyere Stella Okunna Legacy Building which houses the studios and facilities of UNIZIK 94.1FM Campus/Community Radio.

In 2020, Chinyere Stella Okunna became the Chairperson, Anambra State Chapter of NIPR, Director of UNIZIK 94.1FM Campus/Community Radio Station. She is also the Chair, Sensitization and Publicity subcommitee of the task force on COVID-19 in Nnamdi Azikiwe University.

Awards and recognition 
Stella Chinyere Okunna has severally been recognized by different organizations and fora as a trailblazer in mass communication. She is a;

 Fellow, Nigerian Guild of Editors (NGE).
 Fellow, Nigerian Institute of Public Relations (NIPR)
 Member, International Association for Media and Communication Research (IAMCR)
 Member, World Association for Christian Communication (WACC)
 Member, African Council for Communication Education(ACCE)
 Member of Board of Trustees, Association of Communication Scholars and Professionals of Nigeria (ACSPN).
 Member Governing Council, Tansian University
 Kpakpando Ukpo (2003)
 Board Member, Echi Oma Africa Foundation

Family 
Chinyere Stella Okunna is married to Eric Nwabuisi Okunna, a specialist Obstetrician and Gynecologist. They have six (6) grown-up children in different disciplines and many grandchildren.

Publications 
Stella Chinyere Okunna has a number of scholarly works published over the years locally and internationally as articles, books, chapters in books, monographs/occasional publications and conference papers including;

2021 - #EndSARS Protest: Re-thinking Nigerian Youth and Government Policies African Heritage Institution.

2018 - Development Communication in Governance in Nigeria: People at the Centre of Communication? 43rd Inaugural Lecture of Nnamdi Azikiwe University, Awka Nigeria.

2017: Enhancing Media Relations by Public Relations Practitioners in Governance: Lessons from the Peter Obi Administration in Anambra State, 2006-2014. Public Relations Journal, Vol. 13, Nos. 1 & 2, 2017.

2017: Role of the Media in Building a Culture of Peace (C.S Okunna & M. Popoola). In Pate, U. & Oso, L. (ed.), Multiculturalism, Diversity and Reporting Conflict in Nigeria. Ibadan: Evans Brothers Nigeria Limited 2017.

2017: “Communication Skills for Entrepreneurship”. In Alex Ikeme (ed), Entrepreneurship and Business Development. Enugu: Grand-Heritage Global Communication, 2017.

2016: “Discourse on Social Media, Youths and Entrepreneurship in Nigeria” (C.S. Okunna & N. M. Emmanuel). In J.O. Ezeokana et al (ed.), New Media and Capacity Building in Developing Economies. Awka: Fab Anieh Nig. Ltd 2016.

2015: Safety of Journalists in Nigeria. Abuja: UNESCO/NUJ, 2015 (C.S. Okunna & M. Popoola).

2012: Introduction to Mass Communication. Enugu: New Generation Books, 2012 (First published in 1994 by ABIC Books, Enugu – single author; 2nd Edition published in 1999 by New Generation Books – single author; 3rd Edition published in 2012 by New Generation – co-authored with K.A. Omenugha).

2008: Media, Ideology and the Nation: The Nigerian Press Coverage of the Danish Cartoon Crisis (C.S. Okunna & K.A. Omenugha). Journal of Media and Communication, Vol. 1 (1), 2008.

2007: Religion Constrains HIV/AIDS Reporting in Nigeria (C.S. Okunna & I.V. Dunu). Media Development (Toronto, Ontario, Canada: World Association for Christian Communication).

2005: “Re-inventing Media Content: Creating a Balance Between Social Responsibility and Business Concern”. International Journal of Communication.

2005 - Okunna, Stella Chinyere, Nwanguma, Edith & Kevin Ejiofor  – Communicating policy reforms: between the government, the press and the people

2005 - Women: as `invisible' as ever in Nigeria's news media

2004 – Communication and conflict: a commentary on the role of the media

2002 (ed.)- Teaching Mass Communication: A Multi-Dimensional Approach.

1996 - Portrayal of women in Nigerian home video films: empowerment or subjugation

1995 - Small participatory media technology as an agent of social change in Nigeria: a non-existent option?

1995 – Ethics of Mass communication

1994 - Chinyere Stella Okunna, Itsejuwa Esanjumi Sagay, Mallam Lawan Danbazau. Communication Training and Practice in Nigeria: Issues and Perspectives, Issues 1-4

1993 - C.S.Okunna, C. Amafili, and N. Okunna (Eds.). Theory and practice of mass communication. ABIC. Enugu

1993: Theory and Practice of Mass Communication. Enugu: ABIC Books, 1993 (Edited by C.S. Okunna, C. Amafili & S.N. Okenwa).

1993 - Onuora, Emmanuel & Okunna, Chinyere & Ayo, Johnson. Media Use, Knowledge of World Affairs and Image of Nations Among Nigerian Youth.

1992 – Female Faculty in Journalism education in Nigeria: Implications for status of women in the society

1992: Female Faculty in Journalism Education in Nigeria: Implications for the Status of Women in the Society. Africa Media Review (Nairobi: ACCE), Vol. 6, No. 1, 1992.

1992: Communication for Self-Reliance Among Rural Women in Nigeria. Media Development (London: World Association for Christian Communication). Vol. 1, 1992.

1991: The Changing Patterns of Journalism Education and Recruitment in Nigeria CAEJAC Journal (Ontario: Journal of Commonwealth Association for Education in Journalism and Communication – CAEJAC), Vol. 3, 1990/1991.   

1990: Freedom of the Press in the Third World: Freedom for Whom? Nigerian Journal of Mass Communication, Vol. 1, No. 1, 1990.

References

External links 
 http://docplayer.net/31086135-Curriculum-vitae-institutional-affiliation-nnamdi-azikiwe-university-awka-anambra-state-nigeria.html

Nigerian women academics
People from Anambra State
Academic staff of Nnamdi Azikiwe University
Year of birth missing (living people)
Living people
Igbo people